Xia (Hsia in Wade–Giles) may refer to:

Chinese history
 Xia dynasty (c. 2070 – c. 1600 BC), the first orthodox dynasty in Chinese history
 Xia (Sixteen Kingdoms) (407–431), a Xiongnu-led dynasty
 Xia (617–621), a state founded by Dou Jiande near the end of the Sui dynasty
 Western Xia (1038–1227), a Tangut-led dynasty
 Eastern Xia (1215–1233), a Jurchen-led dynasty
 Ming Xia (1362–1371), a short-lived dynasty that existed during the late Yuan dynasty period

Other uses
 Huaxia or Xia, an ancient ethnic group later known as the Han Chinese
 Xia (surname), a Chinese surname
 Xia (philosophy), a Chinese philosophy similar (but not identical) to the chivalrous code of European knights
 Xia County, Shanxi, China
 Xiafs, a file system developed for the Linux operating system together with the Ext2 file system
 Xia class submarine, a Chinese ballistic missile submarine
 XIA, the ICAO Code for Irving Oil, Canada
 XIA (Junsu), a Korean pop artist also known as Xiah and Junsu
 Xia, the former stage name of Korean pop artist Jang Jin Young, formerly of RaNiA
 Xia, a place in the fictional Bionicle universe
 Xia, a hero or knight-errant in Chinese fiction, see wuxia

See also
Sia (disambiguation)